The 1980 North Carolina Tar Heels football team represented the University of North Carolina at Chapel Hill as a member of the Atlantic Coast Conference (ACC) during the 1980 NCAA Division I-A football season. Led by Dick Crum in his third season as ahead coach, the team finished the season with an 11–1 overall record, winning the ACC title with a 6–0 mark in conference played and beating Texas in the Astro–Bluebonnet Bowl. The 11 wins tied a program record set during the 1972 season.

Linebacker Lawrence Taylor had 16 sacks in his final year for the Tar Heels and set numerous defensive records. His accolades included a consensus selection to the 1980 College Football All-America Team included All-America and ACC Player of the Year honors. Crum was named ACC Coach of the Year.

Schedule

Roster

Rankings

Game summaries

Maryland

at Oklahoma

Duke

vs. Texas (Astro-Bluebonnet Bowl)

1981 NFL Draft

The following players were drafted into professional football following the season.

Awards and honors
 Lawrence Taylor, All-America selection
 Lawrence Taylor, Atlantic Coast Conference Player of the Year honors

References

North Carolina
North Carolina Tar Heels football seasons
Atlantic Coast Conference football champion seasons
Bluebonnet Bowl champion seasons
North Carolina Tar Heels football